Yves Archambault (born June 22, 1952, in Montreal, Quebec) is a Canadian former professional ice hockey goaltender. Archambault played 11 games in the World Hockey Association (WHA) with the Philadelphia and Vancouver Blazers. His career goals against average was 5.05.

As a youth, he played in the 1965 Quebec International Pee-Wee Hockey Tournament with a minor ice hockey team from Montreal.
Since retirement from professional hockey, Archambault has worked as a sports agent in Anjou, Quebec.

References

External links

1952 births
Beauce Jaros players
Canadian ice hockey goaltenders
French Quebecers
Ice hockey people from Montreal
Living people
Montreal Canadiens draft picks
Philadelphia Blazers players
Roanoke Valley Rebels (EHL) players
Roanoke Valley Rebels (SHL) players
Canadian sports agents
Tidewater Sharks players
Vancouver Blazers players
Saint-Jérôme Alouettes players
Sorel Éperviers players